Janet McLuckie Brown (14 December 192327 May 2011) was a Scottish actress, comedian and impressionist who gained considerable fame in the 1970s and 1980s for her impersonations of Margaret Thatcher. Brown was the wife of Peter Butterworth, who was best known for his appearances in the Carry On films. Butterworth died in 1979 and Brown never remarried.

Career
Brown was born in Rutherglen, Lanarkshire, and educated at Rutherglen Academy.

During World War II, Brown enlisted in the Auxiliary Territorial Service, and was the first female performer to take part in Stars in Battledress.

She entered British film as an actress in 1948, notably in Folly to Be Wise (1952), and then appeared in several British television series, such as The Eric Barker Half-Hour (1952), How Do You View? (1952–1953) and Friends and Neighbours (1954).

Margaret Thatcher impersonations
Beginning with Margaret Thatcher's election as the leader of the Conservative Party in 1975, Brown gained increasing prominence because of her realistic impression of the Tory politician. She performed as Thatcher on BBC TV's Mike Yarwood Show, on BBC Radio's The News Huddlines, and on film in the 1981 James Bond film, For Your Eyes Only.

In 1979, Brown starred as Thatcher on the comedy album Iron Lady: The Coming of the Leader, written by Private Eye satirist John Wells and produced by Secret Policeman's Ball series co-creator/producer Martin Lewis and Not the Nine O'Clock News series co-creator/producer John Lloyd.  The largely sprechstimme track "Iron Lady" was released as a single, and Brown promoted it on Top of the Pops as a new release, but it did not chart.

She was the subject of This Is Your Life in 1980 when she was surprised by Eamonn Andrews.

During the 1970s and 1980s, she was occasionally confused by some with fellow actress and comedienne Faith Brown because they had the same surname and were both best remembered for their Margaret Thatcher impersonations. In 1990, she recorded a spoken-word sequence in her Margaret Thatcher voice for Mike Oldfield's album Amarok. Still acting in her eighties, her last role was as Old Lady Squeamish on the London West End stage in a production of Wycherley's The Country Wife at the Theatre Royal Haymarket, which opened in September 2007.

She entitled her 1986 autobiography Prime Mimicker.

Personal life
Brown was married to Carry On actor Peter Butterworth from 1946 until his death in 1979. The two appeared alongside each other in the television comedy series How Do You View? (1947–53), written by and starring Terry-Thomas. They also appeared together in the 1972 film, Bless This House. 

The couple had two children, a son, actor Tyler Butterworth (born 1959), and a daughter, Emma, who died in 1996, aged 34.

Brown never remarried, spending the rest of her life in Hove until her death following a brief illness in a nursing home in May 2011, aged 87. She is buried alongside her husband Peter Butterworth in Danehill Cemetery, in East Sussex.

Filmography

References

External links
 
 Obituary in The Guardian
 Janet Brown – The Independent Obituary – May 2011

1923 births
2011 deaths
People from Rutherglen
People educated at Rutherglen Academy
Scottish impressionists (entertainers)
Scottish women comedians
Scottish film actresses
Scottish stage actresses
Scottish television actresses
People from Hove
People from Danehill, East Sussex
Auxiliary Territorial Service soldiers
Military personnel from Lanarkshire
Burials in East Sussex